James George Maguire (February 22, 1853 – June 20, 1920) was an American politician and Georgist who served three terms as a U.S. Representative from California from 1893 to 1899.

Early life and education 
Born in Boston, Massachusetts, Maguire moved with his parents to California in February 1854. He attended the public schools of Watsonville in Santa Cruz County and the private academy of Joseph K. Fallon.

Political career 
Maguire served as a member of the California State Assembly from 1875 to 1877, one of 20 members from the five San Francisco districts. He studied law and was admitted to the Bar by the Supreme Court of California in January 1878, commencing practice in San Francisco. McGuire then served as a judge of the Superior Court of the city and county of San Francisco from 1882 to 1888.

Congress 
He was elected as a Democrat to the U.S. House of Representatives for the Fifty-third, Fifty-fourth, and Fifty-fifth Congresses from March 4, 1893, to March 3, 1899.

In the 1898 state elections, Maguire unsuccessfully ran as the Democratic candidate for Governor of California, losing to Republican Henry Gage. After the election, he did not seek reelection to the U.S. House.

Later career and death
Maguire resumed his law practice in San Francisco, where he died on June 20, 1920. He is interred at Greenlawn Memorial Park, Colma, California.

References

1853 births
1920 deaths
Democratic Party members of the United States House of Representatives from California
Democratic Party members of the California State Assembly
Politicians from San Francisco
Politicians from Boston
People from Watsonville, California
Georgist politicians